HMS Rorqual (S02)  was a Porpoise-class submarine launched in 1956. She was built by the Vickers shipyard in Barrow-in-Furness, Cumbria, England. The boat was named for both the rorqual, a family of whale, and the earlier Second World War-era submarine of the same name.

Design and construction
The Porpoise-class was the first class of operational submarines built for the Royal Navy after the end of the Second World War, and were designed to take advantage of experience gained by studying German Type XXI U-boats and British wartime experiments with the submarine , which was modified by streamlining and fitting a bigger battery.

Displacement was  standard and  full load surfaced and  submerged. Eight 21 inch (533 mm) torpedo tubes were fitted; six in the bow, and two in the stern. Up to 30 torpedoes could be carried, with the initial outfit consisting of the unguided Mark 8 and the homing Mark 20 torpedoes.

Rorqual was laid down at Vickers-Armstrongs' Barrow-in-Furness shipyard on 15 January 1955, was launched on 5 December 1956 and completed on 24 October 1958.

Service
In 1958, Rorqual experienced a fire.

In February 1960, Rorqual visited the Mediterranean, calling at La Spezia in Italy and Nice in southern France before returning home to Faslane at the end of the month. In 1963, she was caught in a trawler's net. An explosion in 1966 killed one junior rate and injured the chief of the watch, who died ashore at Inhambane,  Rorqual was off the coast of Mozambique en route to Singapore. In 1969, Rorqual rammed a moored minesweeper, USS Endurance (MSO-435) while docking at River Point pier in Subic Bay, Philippines. The collision punched a large hole in  Endurance's hull but did not damage Rorqual. At the time of the incident, Rorqual was commanded by Lieutenant-Commander Gavin Menzies who retired the following year and later published the controversial book 1421: The Year China Discovered America.

Rorqual won the SOCA Efficiency trophy in 1973.

Rorqual arrived at the Laira breaker's yard near Plymouth on 5 May 1977. She was broken up by Davies & Cann.

References

Sources

External links
Battleships-Cruisers.co.uk's page of photographs of Porpoise Class submarines

 

British Porpoise-class submarines
Ships built in Barrow-in-Furness
1956 ships